67th Street  was a commuter rail station on the Metra Electric District in Chicago. The station was built on a solid-fill embankment with a pair of island platforms between the inner and outer tracks. Access was made via a pair of stairwells to street level situated underneath the 67th Street viaduct. The station was closed in 1984 due to low ridership. The stairwells to track level were bricked off, however both platforms still exist.

References

Former Illinois Central Railroad stations
Metra stations in Chicago
Railway stations closed in 1984